is a series of role-playing video games created by manga artist Kazuhiro Ochi, published by Telenet and developed by subsidiary LaserSoft from 1990 to 1994. It consists of four games (the last one being split in two installments) for the PC Engine CD console. The first two games were re-released as Cosmic Fantasy Stories, an upgraded compilation for the Sega CD developed by Riot. The series has themes of science fiction, adventure, raunchy comedy, and light erotica. It is notable as among the earlier RPGs to feature extended anime-style cutscenes and voice acting. Cosmic Fantasy 2 was the only game in the series to be released in English, localized and published by Working Designs.

Plot 
Yuu the leader of an interstellar crime force, is fighting space pirates alongside his crew consisting of Saya and the feline Nyan. This time against Berga, who has a love interest in Yuu, which he then declines, forcing Berga to go berserk.

Characters 
Yuu: Minami Takayama

Saya: Yumi Takada

Berga: Rei Sakuma

Nyan: Sanae Miyuki

Tokida Director: Tesshō Genda

Monmo: Yumi Takada

Titles
Cosmic Fantasy: Bōken Shōnen Yū (1990, PC Engine CD)
Cosmic Fantasy 2 (1991, PC Engine, TurboGrafx CD)
Cosmic Fantasy Stories (1992, Sega CD)
Cosmic Fantasy 3: Bōken Shōnen Rei (1992, PC Engine CD)
Cosmic Fantasy Visual Collection (1993, PC Engine CD)
Cosmic Fantasy 4: Ginga Shōnen Densetsu - Totsunyū-hen (1994, PC Engine CD)
Cosmic Fantasy 4: Ginga Shōnen Densetsu - Gekitō-hen (1994, PC Engine CD)
Cosmic Fantasy Collection (2022, Nintendo Switch)

Other media

 is an anime OVA, based on the series. It was released in 1994, on VHS and LaserDisc, shortly before the release of the game Cosmic Fantasy 4.

External links

Moby Games

References 

1990 video games
1994 anime OVAs
Sega CD games
Telenet Japan games
TurboGrafx-CD games
TurboGrafx-CD-only games
Video games developed in Japan
Video games featuring female protagonists